Liza Walker (born 7 July 1972) is a British actress known for the films Hackers (1995) and The Jungle Book (1994), and the television series Maigret (1992).

She was awarded the 1997 London Critics Circle Theatre Award (Jack Tinker Award) for Most Promising Newcomer for her performance in Closer at the Royal National Theatre.

Filmography
El Sueno Del Mono Loco (Twisted Obsession), 1989
Buddy's Song, 1991
Teenage Health Freak, 1991 TV series
Century, 1993
Marooned, 1994 short film
The Jungle Book, 1994
Solitaire for 2, 1995
Hackers, 1995
Savage Play, 1995
E=Mc2, 1996
Mauvaise Passe, 1999
London's Burning, 2002 TV series
Closer, 1997 stage play

Guest appearances and cameos
Casualty, episode "A Will to Die", 1990
Boon, episode "Pillow Talk", 1991
Inspector Morse, episode "Cherubim and Seraphim", 1992
Casualty, episode "Sunday, Bloody Sunday", 1993
Minder, episode "The Roof of All Evil", 1993
99-1, episode "Where The Money Is", 1994
The Good Sex Guide, episode "2.2", 1994
The Bill, episode "Return of the Hunter", 2001
Casualty, episode "Black Dog Day", 2003
  Dalziel and Pascoe, episode " Glory Days" 2006
Doctors, episode "Guilty", 2010
Maigret, episode "Maigret on the Defensive", 1992

References

External links

1972 births
English film actresses
English television actresses
Living people
20th-century English actresses
21st-century English actresses